This article includes the German Football Association's (DFB) women's national youth football teams.

Head coaches

Germany women's national under-23 squad
Caps and goals as of 24 May 2012.

Germany women's national under-20 squad

Germany women's national under-19 squad

Germany women's national under-17 squad

Germany women's national under-15 squad
Caps and goals as of 11 September 2014.

Records

FIFA U-20 Women's World Championship
 Winner (2010, 2014)
 Runner-Up (2012)
 3rd Place (2008)

FIFA U-19 Women's World Championship
 Winner (2004)
 3rd Place (2002)

FIFA U-17 Women's World Championship
 3rd Place (2008)
 4th Place (2012)

UEFA Women's Under-19 Championship
 Winner (2000, 2001, 2002, 2006, 2007, 2011)
 Runner-Up (1999, 2004)

UEFA Women's Under-17 Championship
 Winner (2008, 2009, 2012, 2014, 2016, 2017)
 3rd Place (2010, 2011)

See also
 Germany women's national football team
 Germany women's national under-20 football team
 FIFA U-20 Women's World Cup
 FIFA U-17 Women's World Cup
 UEFA Women's Under-19 Championship
 UEFA Women's Under-17 Championship

References

External links
 Site of the Under-23 national team at the German Football Association (German)
 Site of the Under-20 national team at the German Football Association (German)
 Site of the Under-19 national team at the German Football Association (German)
 Site of the Under-17 national team at the German Football Association (German)
 Site of the Under-16 national team at the German Football Association (German)
 Site of the Under-15 national team at the German Football Association (German)

 

Youth football in Germany
Women's national under-17 association football teams
European women's national under-20 association football teams
Football